Robert "Bob" Fullam (1895–1971) was an Irish footballer and one of the best-known players in the League of Ireland in the 1920s . A versatile attacking player, he was skilful but also had a tough-man image.

Born in Ringsend, the son of John and Mary Fullam, Bob worked as a docker in Dublin, and played for Shelbourne F.C. 1918–21, winning the Irish Cup in 1920. He then transferred to Shamrock Rovers and played in the inaugural Free State Cup final in 1922. In that match, his skirmishes with Charlie Dowdall of eventual champions St. James's Gate F.C. helped provoke post-match disturbances involving players and supporters. This led to a ban for the start of the following season. Nevertheless, he finished top scorer with 27 goals in 22 games, as Rovers won their first League title. He transferred to Leeds United for 1923–24 but played only seven games. He returned to Rovers the next season, helping them to the Double, as "give it to Bob" became a Dublin catchphrase. In the 1926 Cup final, he famously pulled out of a goalmouth challenge, sacrificing a goal (and the Cup) to prevent injuring the Fordsons goalkeeper.

Fullam made his debut for the Irish Free State against Italy in Turin in 1926; he scored in the return match against Italy in 1927. As he was now 30, and the selectors had a preference for young players, this second cap was his last. He continued to play for Shamrock Rovers into the early 1930s.

In 1927/28 he went to the United States along with Dinny Doyle and several other players from both North and South. Upon their arrival in Philadelphia, they formed their club which was known as Irish Philadelphia Celtic. After a year Bob returned to Dublin where he renewed his association with Rovers.

After his playing days, Bob continued with the Hoops as a coach, a capacity he held until his departure to London in 1945.

His time with Rovers was littered with medals. He won the League and the FAI Cup 4 times scoring 92 league goals and 9 Cup goals along with 6 Inter-League caps.

In 1956 Bob was awarded damages in a libel case taken against the Sunday Dispatch for a story that the journalist admitted making up.

During his time at Shamrock Rovers Fullam played alongside his second cousin Billy Behan who later became a successful scout for Manchester United.

Fullam died in Slough on 21 July 1971.

Honours
Shamrock Rovers
 League of Ireland: 4
 1922–23, 1924–25, 1926–27, 1930–31
  FAI Cup: 4
 1925, 1929, 1930, 1931
  League of Ireland Shield: 3
 1924–25, 1926–27, 1931–32
  Leinster Senior Cup: 4
 1923, 1927, 1929, 1930
 Leinster Senior League: 1
 1921–22
Individual
League of Ireland Top Scorer:
 1922–23 (27 goals).

References

External links
 Picture
 Leeds United
Bob Fullam and the Great K.O.

Republic of Ireland association footballers
Republic of Ireland international footballers
League of Ireland players
Shamrock Rovers F.C. players
Shamrock Rovers F.C. managers
League of Ireland managers
Shelbourne F.C. players
Leeds United F.C. players
English Football League players
Association footballers from Dublin (city)
1895 births
1974 deaths
League of Ireland XI players
Leinster Senior League (association football) players
Association football forwards
Republic of Ireland football managers